Gratian or Gratianus (died c. February 407) was a Roman usurper in Roman Britain from 406-407.

Career
Following the murder of the usurper Marcus, Gratian was acclaimed as emperor by the army in Britain in late 406, probably around October.  His background, as recorded by Orosius, was that he was a Romano-Briton and one of the urban aristocracy, possibly a curialis. The elevation of a non-military official by the army suggests that there were issues that the army felt would be better handled by a civilian official, such as pay, or perhaps disagreements between the Comes Britanniarum, the Comes Litoris Saxonici and the Dux Britanniarum.

Gratian’s usurpation coincided with a huge barbarian invasion that had penetrated Gaul; on the last day of December 406, an army of Vandals, Alans and Suebi (Sueves) had crossed the frozen Rhine. During 407, they spread across northern Gaul towards Boulogne, and Zosimus wrote that the troops in Britain feared an invasion across the English Channel.

The historian J. B. Bury speculated that it was Stilicho, the emperor Honorius’s magister militum, who instigated the barbarian invasion of Gaul, as he was concerned about the British usurpers, but was unable to move against them because of the activities of Radagaisus and Alaric I.The invasion was therefore meant to distract the British army. This hypothesis has been rejected by modern historians such as Thomas Burns, who argue that Stilicho was reliant on the Gallic army to deal with the rebellion. It was only with the heavy losses suffered by the Gallic field armies in the aftermath of the Vandal invasion that Stilicho had to reassess his response to the British rebellion.

As news filtered through to Britain of the barbarian invasion, and their rapid approach towards Boulogne (the main port that supplies and troops bound for Britain would come from), the army became agitated. It is speculated that the army wanted to cross to Gaul and stop the barbarians but Gratian ordered them to remain. Unhappy with this, the troops killed him after a reign of four months and around the beginning of February they chose Constantine III as their leader.

Geoffrey of Monmouth describes a similar character, named Gracianus Municeps, who is probably the same figure.

He is one of three would-be Emperors described in Alfred Duggan's historic novel The Little Emperors.

Sources

Primary sources
 Zosimus, "Historia Nova", Book 6 Historia Nova
 Orosius, Historiae adversum Paganos, 7.40

Secondary sources
 Birley, Anthony R., The Roman Government of Britain, Oxford University Press, 2005, 
 Burns, Thomas Samuel, Barbarians Within the Gates of Rome: A Study of Roman Military Policy and the Barbarians, Ca. 375-425 A.D., Indiana University Press, 1994, 
 Jones, Arnold Hugh Martin, John Robert Martindale, John Morris, The Prosopography of the Later Roman Empire, volume 2, Cambridge University Press, 1992, 
 Bury, J. B., A History of the Later Roman Empire from Arcadius to Irene, Vol. I (1889)

Footnotes

References 

407 deaths
British traditional history
5th-century Roman usurpers
Ancient Romans in Britain
Year of birth unknown